Gentle Rain is a trio album led by pianist John Hicks, recorded in 1994.

Recording and music
The album was recorded at Acoustic Recording, Brooklyn, New York, on May 10 and 11, 1994. The musicians were pianist John Hicks, bassist Walter Booker, and drummer Louis Hayes. "Missing You" is played at a slow tempo; "Countdown" is up-tempo.

Release and reception

Gentle Rain was released by Sound Hills. The reviewer for Cadence Magazine reported that "the playing shows few surprises, but Hicks is clearly a master of his instrument, a commanding presence, in total control."

Track listing
"Solar"
"Gentle Rain"
"We'll Be Together Again"
"Hi-Fly"
"That Old Devil Called Love"
"I'll Take Romance"
"Goodbye Pork Pie Hat"
"Countdown"
"Missing You"
"Ruby, My Dear"

Personnel
John Hicks – piano
Walter Booker – bass
Louis Hayes – drums

References

John Hicks (jazz pianist) albums
1994 albums